Gus Martin may refer to.

 Augustine Martin (Irish academic)
 C. Augustus Martin (Author on terrorism)